Once Upon a Time in Cabramatta is a three-part Australian documentary television series. It began screening on SBS One on 8 January 2012. It was also simulcast on SBS Two with Vietnamese subtitles.

The mini-series tells the turbulent story of Cabramatta, a suburb of southwest Sydney, whose ethnic blend eventually changed Australia's attitude to multiculturalism.
The White Australia is over as Malcolm Fraser opens the gates for the immigrants seeking asylum. It includes interviews of families who immigrated from Vietnam post war and were forced to adapt to Australia. We hear their story of racism among and the formation of Vietnamese gangs from children without parents.
The series was released on DVD on 4 April 2012.

The first episode attracted 626,000 viewers, coming in 9th for the night and 2nd in its timeslot.

References

External links 
Official SBS website

Special Broadcasting Service original programming
2010s Australian documentary television series
2012 Australian television series debuts
2012 Australian television series endings
History of immigration to Australia
Racism in Australia
Cabramatta, New South Wales
Television series by Northern Pictures